Henry Vits (January 21, 1842 – December 7, 1921) was an American businessman and politician.

Born in Rheydt, Prussia, Vits emigrated with his parents to the United States in 1855 and settled in Manitowoc, Wisconsin. Vits owned a grist mill and was involved with the tannery business. In 1898, Vits started the Manitowoc Aluminum Novelty Company in Manitowoc, which eventually merged into the combined Mirro Aluminum Company. Vits served as postmaster in Manitowoc during the administration of President Grover Cleveland. He also served on the school board, the Manitowoc Common Council, and the Manitowoc County Board of Supervisors. In 1878, Vits served in the Wisconsin State Assembly. He died  suddenly of a stroke at his home in Manitowoc.

References

1842 births
1921 deaths
German emigrants to the United States
People from Manitowoc, Wisconsin
Businesspeople from Wisconsin
Wisconsin postmasters
Wisconsin city council members
County supervisors in Wisconsin
School board members in Wisconsin
Democratic Party members of the Wisconsin State Assembly